Chionodes ceryx is a moth in the family Gelechiidae. It is found in North America, where it has been recorded from Florida.

The wingspan is about 15 mm. Adults have been recorded on wing nearly year round.

References

Chionodes
Moths described in 1999
Moths of North America